KTVP-LD, virtual channel 22 (UHF digital channel 23), is a low-power television station licensed to Phoenix, Arizona, United States. The station is owned by HC2 Holdings. KTVP-LD's transmitter is located on South Mountain.

History
The original construction permit was granted September 28, 1992 to Simon, Inc. The station was given call sign K56FF, to broadcast on channel 56 from Usery Mountain in east Mesa. In March 1995, Simon, Inc. sold the permit to Keith L. Lowery, who licensed the station on November 28, 1995, then sold it to AIN Network, Inc. in June 1996. The station was listed as an American Independent Network affiliate as of July 1996. AIN Network, Inc. changed the station's calls to KTVP-LP in September 1997 and transferred the station to Hispano Television Ventures, Inc. (HTV), later called Hispanic Television Network Inc., in October 1999 as part of HTV's acquisition of AIN Network, Inc. HTV placed their new network, Hispanic Television Network (HTVN), on KTVP-LP, but facing financial difficulties, Hispanic Television Network Inc. sold the station to Mako Communications LLC in August 2001.

In 1998, ABC affiliate KNXV-TV (channel 15) was granted a permit to construct their digital facilities on channel 56, which forced KTVP-LP to move to a new channel. The station went silent for a time, but in 2002, Mako Communications moved the transmitter location to South Mountain and began broadcasting the America's Store shopping channel on channel 64. In January 2006, needing to vacate the 700 MHz band, KTVP-LP moved to channel 22. At that time, Mako Communications also switched programming to Almavision. On June 13, 2011, reflecting its conversion to digital operation, the station's call sign was changed to KTVP-LD.

In June 2013, KTVP-LD was slated to be sold to Landover 5 LLC as part of a larger deal involving 51 other low-power television stations; the sale fell through in June 2016. Mako Communications sold its stations, including KTVP-LD, to HC2 Holdings in 2017.

Subchannels
The station's digital signal is multiplexed:

Former translators
KTVP-LD's signal was formerly relayed on the following translator stations, but is not any longer:

References

External links

Classic Reruns TV affiliates
TVP-LD
Television channels and stations established in 1995
1995 establishments in Arizona
Low-power television stations in the United States
Innovate Corp.